Arshad Hussain Urdu: ارشںد حسیں (born 13 July 1990, in Karachi) is an amateur Pakistani boxer.

Career
Hussain fights in the Welterweight (69 kg) class. He is being supported by Pakistan Air Force.

2010
At the 2010 Asian Games in Guangzhou, he defeated Palestine's Ahmed Altaramsi in the round of 32 when the referee stopped the fight. In the round of 16 he was defeated by Philippines's Wilfredo Lopez.

References

Living people
1990 births
Boxers at the 2010 Asian Games
Martial artists from Karachi
Pakistani male boxers
Asian Games competitors for Pakistan
Welterweight boxers
21st-century Pakistani people